Last Decade Dead Century is the debut album by the band Warrior Soul released in 1990.   The album was remastered and re-released with bonus tracks on CD and MP3 by Escapi Music in 2006, and again on vinyl in 2009.

Track listing 

 "I See the Ruins" - 4:56
 "We Cry Out" - 5:01
 "The Losers" - 6:16
 "Downtown" - 5:10
 "Trippin' on Ecstasy" - 4:42
 "Four More Years" - 4:36
 "Superpower Dreamland" - 3:41
 "Charlie's out of Prison" - 4:50
 "Blown Away" - 3:28
 "Lullaby" - 4:53
 "In Conclusion" - 6:36
 ""Charlie's out of Prison (live)" - 5:26 [2006 Escapi bonus track]
 "The Losers (live)" - 9:34 [2006 Escapi bonus track]
 "I See the Ruins (live)" - 5:42 [2006 Escapi bonus track]

Personnel
 Kory Clarke - lead vocals
 John Ricco - guitar
 Pete McClanahan - bass guitar
 Paul Ferguson - drums

Production
 Mastered by George Marino at Sterling Sound, NYC

References

1990 debut albums
Warrior Soul albums
Geffen Records albums